The Kicks is an American teen sitcom created by Alex Morgan and David Babcock. Babcock also serves as executive producer alongside James Frey. The pilot premiered on Amazon Prime Video on June 26, 2015.

Synopsis
Twelve-year-old soccer player Devin Burke is on the verge of being named seventh-grade captain of her Connecticut school soccer team when her family moves to California midway through the school year. Now, Devin has to rise to the challenge after discovering that her new school team has been on a losing streak over the last few months and is badly in need of a captain to rally the team together. However, disaster strikes when their coach quits, as she was pregnant and expecting soon. With no coach and two games fast approaching, the girls enlist the help of the janitor, Pablo Rivas. Pablo is hard on them but also kind, as he remembers what it was like when he was their age.

Cast and characters

Main
Sixx Orange as Devin Burke
Isabella Acres as Mirabelle Harris
Emyri Crutchfield as Zoe Knox
Gabe Eggerling as Bailey Burke, Devin's younger brother
Sophia Mitri Schloss as Emma Gelbaum
Monica Lacy as Sharon Burke, Devin's mother
Tim Martin Gleason as Tom Burke, Devin's father

Recurring
Alejandro Furth as Coach Rivas
Noah Urrea as Cody McBride
Noemi Gonzalez as Coach Flores
Ashley Liao as Parker
Jane Widdop as Lily Padgett

Production
The Kicks was ordered to pilot by Amazon on September 15, 2014. The show is based on the best selling book series of the same name, written by U.S. soccer star Alex Morgan, illustrated by Paula Franco. The pilot premiered on Amazon Instant Video on June 26, 2015 as a part of Amazon's fifth pilot season. Amazon ordered the pilot to series on November 6, 2015. Filming for the series began on February 22, 2016.

Episodes

Reception
On Amazon, 93% of all customer reviews of the pilot were five-stars, and 97% were either five-stars or four-stars. This was high enough to warrant a series order for the show.

References

External links

2010s American school television series
2010s American single-camera sitcoms
2010s American teen sitcoms
2015 American television series debuts
2016 American television series endings
English-language television shows
Amazon Prime Video original programming
Television series by Amazon Studios
Television shows set in California
Middle school television series
Amazon Prime Video children's programming
Women's association football television series
Television series about children
Television series about families